The Gallitzin Tunnels in Gallitzin, Pennsylvania, are a set of three adjacent tunnels through the Allegheny Mountains in western Pennsylvania. They were completed in 1854, 1855, and 1902 by the Pennsylvania Railroad as part of the cross-state route that includes the nearby Horseshoe Curve to the east.  Their ownership has since passed to Penn Central Transportation Company, then to Conrail, and most recently to the Norfolk Southern Railway. The tunnels are currently used by Norfolk Southern freight trains and Amtrak Pennsylvanian passenger trains.

History

Construction 
The first tunnel, which is the middle of the three bores through the mountain, was built by the PRR from 1851 to 1854. Originally named "Summit" Tunnel, it is 3,612 feet long at an elevation of 2,167 feet above mean sea level and is known today as the Allegheny Tunnel.

The second tunnel, the southernmost of the bores, was constructed by the Commonwealth of Pennsylvania from 1852 to 1855 as part of the New Portage Railroad (NPRR).  In 1857, the PRR bought the New Portage Railroad from the Commonwealth, and appropriated the "Allegheny" name for its "Summit" tunnel.  The PRR took the New Portage Tunnel out of service shortly thereafter. In the 1890s, it was expanded to two tracks and used as the primary route for eastbound traffic.

The third tunnel, the Gallitzin Tunnel, was begun in 1902 and opened in 1904  immediately to the north of the Allegheny Tunnel.

Later history 
In the early 1990s, Conrail (with money from the Commonwealth of Pennsylvania) enlarged the Allegheny and New Portage Tunnels to accommodate double-stack container on flatcar (COFC) trains. The New Portage Tunnel was opened for eastbound COFC traffic in 1993. The Allegheny Tunnel was enlarged from its original 1854 cross-section to contain two tracks that could be used for double-stack rail transport in either direction. The work was completed in September 1995, and the Gallitzin Tunnel (which was not enlarged) was taken out of service.

Amtrak's Pennsylvanian trains travel through the tunnel.

Gallitzin Tunnels Park & Museum
Near the closed tunnel sits the Gallitzin Tunnels Park & Museum, which has a restored 1942 Pennsylvania caboose whose interior is visible to visitors. The museum, which sits across the street, has exhibits about the area's railroad, industrial, social, and religious heritage; a gift shop, and a theater. The museum building also houses borough offices, a police station, a library, and an archival room.

See also
 List of tunnels documented by the Historic American Engineering Record in Pennsylvania

References

External links

Gallitzin Tunnels Park & Museum
The Gallitzin Tunnel Inn

 - Western portal of Allegheny and Gallitzin Tunnels
 - Eastern portal of Allegheny and Gallitzin Tunnels
 - Western portal of New Portage Tunnel
 - Eastern portal of New Portage Tunnel

Pennsylvania Railroad tunnels
Railroad tunnels in Pennsylvania
Norfolk Southern Railway tunnels
Transportation buildings and structures in Cambria County, Pennsylvania
Historic American Engineering Record in Pennsylvania
Museums in Cambria County, Pennsylvania
Railroad museums in Pennsylvania